

References

Brazil Hot 100
2012 Hot 100